A prosopopoeia is a rhetorical device in which a speaker or writer communicates to the audience by speaking as another person or object. The term literally derives from the Greek roots  "face, person", and  "to make, to do".

Prosopopoeiae are used mostly to give another perspective on the action being described. For example, in Cicero's Pro Caelio, Cicero speaks as Appius Claudius Caecus, a stern old man. This serves to give the "ancient" perspective on the actions of the plaintiff. Prosopopoeiae can also be used to take some of the load off the communicator by placing an unfavorable point of view on the shoulders of an imaginary stereotype. The audience's reactions are predisposed to go towards this figment rather than the communicator himself.

This term also refers to a figure of speech in which an animal or inanimate object is ascribed human characteristics or is spoken of in anthropomorphic language.  Quintilian writes of the power of this figure of speech to "bring down the gods from heaven, evoke the dead, and give voices to cities and states" (Institutes of Oratory [see ref.]).

Examples

Speaking with another's voice 
A classic example of this usage can be found in the deuterocanonical book of Sirach in the Bible, where Wisdom is personified and made to speak to the people and to the reader:

Another example occurs in the second section of the Cooper Union speech by Abraham Lincoln, who creates a mock debate between Republicans and the South, a debate in which he becomes spokesman for the party.

Ascribing human characteristics to a non-person 
In Jeremiah 47, there is a dialogue between the sword of the Lord and the prophet: 

In court a prosecutor may suggest to jurors that a homicide victim is "speaking to us through the evidence". Before becoming a Senator, John Edwards was reputed to have made such an argument in one of his most famous tort cases, representing the family of a girl who had been killed by a defective pool drain.

Slavoj Žižek, in his book The Year of Dreaming Dangerously (Verso Books 2012, p. 14), wrote:

Yogi Berra, speaking of a former Yankees manager, said: "If Miller Huggins was alive today, he'd be turning over in his grave".

William Shakespeare, Sonnet 129 reads, in part:

See also
Anthropomorphism
Character mask
Personification

References
Literary Encyclopedia page on Prosopopoeia
Quintilian's Institutes of Oratory, Bk. IX Ch. II

Rhetoric
Figures of speech

eu:Prosopopeia